Lucas Edward Britton Mockridge (born 21 March 1989) is a comedian and television presenter living in Germany. He holds Canadian and Italian citizenship.

Early life 
Mockridge is son of the Canadian actor and comedian Bill Mockridge and the Italian actress and comedian Margie Kinsky. He was raised in Endenich and has two older and three younger brothers. His siblings are all involved in the show business, as directors, musicians, singers, actors and models. One of his brothers is actor Jeremy Mockridge. Luke Mockridge lives in Cologne. His godfather was Dirk Bach.

Career 

Upon completing his school finals ("Abitur"), Mockridge undertook a university programme in media and communications science in Canada, England and Germany, from which he obtained a bachelor's degree in 2012. During his studies in Canada, Mockridge made an appearance in the High School Musical Stage Programme as Chad.

Since 2012, Mockridge has been touring through Germany with the solo show I'm Lucky, I'm Luke!. In German national television, he has made regular appearances at NightWash, Quatsch Comedy Club, TV total, RTL Comedy Grand Prix, and Fun(k)haus. Mockridge is the host of 1LIVE Hörsaal-Comedy and works as writer of Switch reloaded. In September 2013, he launched his own comedy show on KiKa and ZDF called Occupy School.

Since 26 September 2013, Mockridge took over the role as presenter at NightWash. Prior to this time, he had been employed by NightWash as intern and author. Moreover, Mockridge moderated before an audience of 7,000 people on 14 October 2013 the 1LIVE Comedynacht XXL in the sold-out Lanxess Arena in Cologne. During 2013, he also appeared for a period of time non-regularly at the YouTube channel Ponk.

In 2014, Mockridge launched the YouTube channel Snoozzze, together with German Youtubers Julian "Julez" Weißbach and Joyce Ilg. In January 2014, he travelled to New York with Stefan Raab and his show TV total and shot continuously for six days live for the Super Bowl XLVIII.

In 2016, it was announced that Mockridge would be a host on the Netflix reality show Ultimate Beastmaster.

Awards 
In 2013, Mockridge was awarded "Pascha des Monats" by EMMA magazine for making so called "Herrenwitze" (nearest equivalent: "sexist jokes") during a stand-up act. Allegedly making fun of his ex-girlfriend was used as the reason for the prize. The programme in which the act occurred, claims, however, that the jokes were taken out of context. In 2013, Mockridge was awarded the German Comedy Award as Best Newcomer.

References

External links 

 Personal website
 

Canadian male comedians
Canadian television hosts
Canadian television talk show hosts
Canadian male television actors
21st-century Canadian male writers
Italian male comedians
Italian television presenters
Italian male television actors
Italian male writers
German male television actors
German game show hosts
German comedians
German male actors
Canadian people of Italian descent
Italian people of Canadian descent
Mass media people from Bonn
Actors from Bonn
Sat.1 people
RTL Group people
ProSieben people
1989 births
Living people